The Starr Manor, at 901 Palmer Ave. in Glenwood Springs, Colorado, is a Queen Anne-style house which was built in 1901.  It was listed on the National Register of Historic Places in 1986.

It was deemed "significant as a good example of a large, intact Queen Anne residence, defined by the textured wall surfaces, wrap-around porch, multi-gabled roof, circular bay, and spindles, pendants, and sunburst detailing."

The listing includes a carriage house which was built around 1910.

References

National Register of Historic Places in Garfield County, Colorado
Queen Anne architecture in Colorado
Buildings and structures completed in 1901